The 1899 Purdue Boilermakers football team was an American football team that represented Purdue University during the 1899 college football season. The Boilermakers compiled a 4–4–1 record and were outscored by their opponents by a total of 122 to 100 in their second season under head coach Alpha Jamison. Edward C. Robertson was the team captain.

Schedule

References

Purdue
Purdue Boilermakers football seasons
Purdue Boilermakers football